The Chandlers Creek, a perennial stream that is part of the Clarence River catchment, is located in the Northern Tablelands region of New South Wales, Australia.

Course and features
The river flows generally to the northeast then north northwest through parts of the Guy Fawkes River and Chaelundi national parks, joined by two minor tributaries before reaching its confluence with the Boyd River at Louis Point, a locality on the Old Glen Innes Grafton Road west of Coutts Crossing. The river descends  over its  course.

See also

 Rivers of New South Wales
 List of rivers of New South Wales (A-K)
 List of rivers of Australia

References

External links

 

Rivers of New South Wales
New England (New South Wales)
Northern Tablelands